San Juan Nonualco is a municipality in the La Paz department of El Salvador. According to the official census of 2007, it has a population of 17.256 inhabitants, although for the year 2016 it is estimated that 19,336 inhabitants live in the city.

References

Municipalities of the La Paz Department (El Salvador)